Lake Eymir is a small lake in Ankara Province, Turkey. According to notes of Seyyah Kandemir published by the governorate of Ankara in 1932, the lake was named after a Turkmen tribe named Eymür.

Geography 
The southern shore lies along the ring road  of Ankara. The shape of the lake roughly resembles the letter S.

Geology 
The lake is an alluvial set lake. When the level of Lake Eymir increases beyond a certain level, the extra water is discharged to the River İmrahor. During the flood in 1910, Lake Mogan and Lake Eymir temporarily merged.

Near history  
According to 1930 travel notes of Nahit Sırrı Örik the area surrounding the lake was arid land devoid of any green plantation. In 1956,  land including Lake Eymir was allocated to the Middle East Technical University campus. Now ODTÜ is the only university in Turkey with a lake in the campus area. Immediately after 1956, the first rector of the university Kemal Kurdaş began a forestation project around the lake. Now most of the once-barren land is a pine forest. In 1995, Kemal Kurdas and Alattin Egemen, director of reforestation of the Middle East Technical University, shared the Aga Khan Award for Architecture for the re-forestation work done on 45 km2 area of Middle East Technical University including Lake Eymir and surroundings.

Access 
The lake has two entrances to the east and west, and it is open to public. Only cars with a special permit are admitted inside the lake area in order to eliminate the pollution and risk of traffic accidents. However the parking lots located near both entrances are free for use. For public use, there is a transportation services at the door to recreational areas.

References

Eymir
Landforms of Ankara Province
Central Anatolia Region
Middle East Technical University